Gustavo Bonatto Barreto (born 10 December 1995), simply known as Barreto, is a Brazilian footballer who plays as a defensive midfielder for Belgian club RWDM on loan from Botafogo.

Club career
Born in Nova Prata, Rio Grande do Sul, Barreto graduated with Criciúma's youth setup, after having spells at Esportivo de Bento Gonçalves and Caxias. In 2010, aged only 15, he made his debuts as a senior with Nova Prata, in Copa FGF.

Barreto made his first team – and Série A – debut on 23 November 2014, starting in a 1–1 away draw against Flamengo.

In May 2018 Barreto was loaned to Chapecoense for the 2018 Campeonato Brasileiro Série A season. In 2019 he was loaned to Red Bull Brasil, becoming part of the Red Bull Bragantino team due to the merger with Clube Atlético Bragantino.

On 25 August 2022, Barreto joined RWDM in Belgium on loan.

References

External links

1995 births
Sportspeople from Rio Grande do Sul
Living people
Brazilian footballers
Association football midfielders
Criciúma Esporte Clube players
Associação Chapecoense de Futebol players
Red Bull Brasil players
Red Bull Bragantino players
Associação Atlética Ponte Preta players
Botafogo de Futebol e Regatas players
RWDM47 players
Campeonato Brasileiro Série A players
Campeonato Brasileiro Série B players
Challenger Pro League players
Footballers at the 2015 Pan American Games
Pan American Games bronze medalists for Brazil
Pan American Games medalists in football
Medalists at the 2015 Pan American Games
Brazilian expatriate footballers
Expatriate footballers in Belgium
Brazilian expatriate sportspeople in Belgium